Salme Ekbaum (until 1941 Salme Neumann; 21 October 1912 Paistu Parish, Viljandi County – 10 September 1995 Toronto) was an Estonian writer and poet.

He graduated from University of Tartu, studying pharmacy. In 1944 she escaped to Sweden and in 1949 moved to Canada.

From 1950 she was a member of Estonian Writers' Union in Exile and a member of PEN Club.

She died in 1995 and is buried in Paistu Cemetery. Her sister was writer Minni Nurme.

Works
 1959: novel Varjude maja (House of Shadows)
 1975: novel Vang, kes põgenes (The Prisoner Who Escaped)
 1979: novel Kohtumine lennujaamas (Meeting at an Airport)

References

External links
 Salme Ekbaum at Estonian Writers' Online Dictionary

1912 births
1995 deaths
20th-century Estonian women writers
Estonian women poets
20th-century Estonian poets
University of Tartu alumni
People from Viljandi Parish
Estonian World War II refugees
Estonian emigrants to Canada